Batagay (Baatağay) is an urban locality (an urban-type settlement) and the administrative center of Verkhoyansky District of the Sakha Republic, Russia, located on the Yana River. As of the 2010 Census, its population was 4,369.

Geography
Batagay is located a short distance to the west of river Adycha. The Batagaika crater is located 10 km to the southeast and the Kisilyakh Range 40 km to the northeast of the town.

History
Urban-type settlement status was granted to Batagay in 1945.

Administrative and municipal status
Within the framework of administrative divisions, the urban-type settlement of Batagay serves as the administrative center of Verkhoyansky District. As an administrative division, it is, together with two rural localities, incorporated within Verkhoyansky District as the Settlement of Batagay. As a municipal division, the Settlement of Batagay is incorporated within Verkhoyansky Municipal District as Batagay Urban Settlement.

Transportation
Batagay is served by the Batagay Airport.

References

Notes

Sources
Official website of the Sakha Republic. Registry of the Administrative-Territorial Divisions of the Sakha Republic. Verkhoyansky District. 

Urban-type settlements in the Sakha Republic
Populated places of Arctic Russia
Road-inaccessible communities of the Sakha Republic
Yana basin